Yury Holub (born 16 April 1996) is a Belarusian male visually impaired  cross-country skier and biathlete. He made his Paralympic debut during the 2018 Winter Paralympics and went onto claim 3 medals so far in his maiden Paralympic appearance including a gold medal. He claimed his first Paralympic gold medal after winning the men's 12.5km visually impaired biathlon event during the 2018 Winter Paralympics.

He also claimed silver medals in the men's 7.5km visually impaired biathlon event and men's 20km free visually impaired cross-country skiing event as a part of the 2018 Winter Paralympics with the assistance of his sighted guide, Dzmitry Budzilovich.

He won the gold medal in the men's 6km visually impaired biathlon event at the 2021 World Para Snow Sports Championships held in Lillehammer, Norway. He also won the gold medal in the men's 10km visually impaired biathlon event. In cross-country skiing, he won the bronze medal in the men's 12.5km visually impaired event.

References

External links 
 

1996 births
Living people
Belarusian male biathletes
Belarusian male cross-country skiers
Biathletes at the 2018 Winter Paralympics
Cross-country skiers at the 2018 Winter Paralympics
Paralympic cross-country skiers of Belarus
Paralympic biathletes of Belarus
Paralympic gold medalists for Belarus
Paralympic silver medalists for Belarus
Paralympic bronze medalists for Belarus
Medalists at the 2018 Winter Paralympics
Visually impaired category Paralympic competitors
Paralympic medalists in cross-country skiing
Paralympic medalists in biathlon
Belarusian people with disabilities
Blind people